Guillermina Casique Vences (born 2 August 1961) is a Mexican politician from the Institutional Revolutionary Party. From 2009 to 2012, she served as Deputy of the LXI Legislature of the Mexican Congress, representing the State of Mexico.

References

1961 births
Living people
Politicians from the State of Mexico
Women members of the Chamber of Deputies (Mexico)
Members of the Chamber of Deputies (Mexico)
Institutional Revolutionary Party politicians
21st-century Mexican politicians
21st-century Mexican women politicians
Deputies of the LXI Legislature of Mexico